The Gang of 22 was a group of Fianna Fáil TDs (members of parliament) who were opposed to the leadership of Charles Haughey in the early 1980s. The very evident division within the Fianna Fáil parliamentary party left a deep split in the organisation.

The origins of the "Gang of 22" was when Desmond O'Malley challenged Charles Haughey for the leadership of Fianna Fáil in 1983. Disillusioned with the unwillingness of O'Malley, George Colley and their supporters to act, a motion of no confidence against Charles Haughey's leadership was put forward by Charlie McCreevy on his own initiative. This forced O'Malley's hand and he had to declare his intention to stand against Haughey. The vote failed by 55 votes to 22.

Those who made up the Gang of 22 were:
David Andrews
Sylvester Barrett 
Thomas Bellew
Séamus Brennan 
Hugh Byrne
Sean Byrne
George Colley
Hugh Conaghan
Pádraig Faulkner
Tom Fitzpatrick
Seán French
Jim Gibbons
Mary Harney
Tom Meaney
Charlie McCreevy 
Bobby Molloy
Ciarán Murphy
Willie O'Dea
Martin O'Donoghue
Desmond O'Malley 
Joe Walsh 
Pearse Wyse

The name is a reference to the Gang of Four, a political faction in the People's Republic of China who were imprisoned after the death of Mao Zedong.

In September 1991 four backbench Fianna Fáil TDs: Noel Dempsey, Liam Fitzgerald, M. J. Nolan and Seán Power (known as the Gang of Four) put down a motion of no-confidence in Haughey's leadership in Power's name. This prompted Albert Reynolds to resign from the Cabinet and launch a leadership challenge. He was supported by fellow Minister Pádraig Flynn and Minister of State Máire Geoghegan-Quinn and subsequently Noel Treacy. The vote failed by 55 votes to 22.

This is a partial list:
David Andrews
Michael Barrett
Brian Cowen
Noel Dempsey
Jackie Fahey
Liam Fitzgerald
Pádraig Flynn
Máire Geoghegan-Quinn
Brian Hillery
Tom Kitt
Liam Lawlor
Jimmy Leonard
Charlie McCreevy
M. J. Nolan
John O'Connell
Willie O'Dea
Seán Power  
Albert Reynolds
Michael Smith
Noel Treacy
Joe Walsh

References

Charles Haughey
History of Fianna Fáil
Politics of the Republic of Ireland